Proboys is a 1995 Philippine comedy drama film directed by Ike Jarlego Jr. The film stars Ruby Rodriguez, Beth Tamayo, Giselle Sanchez, Joanne Pascual and Sharmaine Suarez. This marks the theatrical debut of Joanne, Sharmaine and Introvoys vocalist Paco Arespacochaga.

The film is streaming online on YouTube.

Cast
 Ruby Rodriguez as Louie
 Beth Tamayo as Mylene
 Giselle Sanchez as Cherry Pie
 Joanne Pascual as Twinkle
 Sharmaine Suarez as Zena
 Niño Muhlach as Dennis
 Brando Legaspi as Gardo
 Jojo Abellana as Jolo
 Emilio Garcia as Mando
 Paco Arespacochaga as Mike
 Edmund Cupcupin as Paquito
 Liza Lorena as Twinkle's Mother
 Jaime Fabregas as Louie's Father
 Cecille Iñigo as Louie's Mother
 Carlo 1 as Louie's Brother
 Carlo 2 as Louie's Brother
 Pocholo Montes as Mylene's Father
 Jason San Pedro as Mylene's Brother

References

External links

Full Movie on SolarFlix

1995 films
Filipino-language films
Philippine comedy films
Philippine drama films
Moviestars Production films
Films directed by Ike Jarlego Jr.